Warren High School is a public high school in Vincent, Ohio, United States. It is the only secondary school in the Warren Local School District. Athletic teams compete as the Warren Warriors in the Ohio High School Athletic Association as a member of both the Ohio Valley Athletic Conference and Twin State League. It is one of the only high schools left in the country with a dedicated hand bells program.

References

External links
 Warren Local School District
 Warren High School
 Warren High School Bands

High schools in Washington County, Ohio
Public high schools in Ohio